The Koszalin Voivodeship was a voivodeship (province) of the Polish People's Republic from 1975 to 1989, and the Third Republic of Poland from 1989 to 1998. Its capital was Koszalin, and it was centered on the eastern Farther Pomerania. It was established on 1 June 1975, from the part of the Koszalin Voivodeship, and existed until 31 December 1998, when it was incorporated into then-established West Pomeranian Voivodeship.

History 
The Szczecin Voivodeship was established on 1 June 1975, as part of the administrative reform, and was one of the voivodeships (provinces) of the Polish People's Republic. It was formed from the part of the territory of the Koszalin Voivodeship. Its capital was located in the city of Koszalin. In 1975, it was inhabited by 434 800 people.

On 9 December 1989, the Polish People's Republic was replaced by the Third Republic of Poland. In 1997, the voivodeship had a population of 527 600, and in 1998, it had an area of 8470	km². It existed until 31 December 1998, when it was incorporated into then-established West Pomeranian Voivodeship.

Subdivisions 

In 1997, the voivodeship was divided into 41 gminas (municipalities), including 6 urban municipalities, 12 urban-rural municipalities, and 23 rural municipalities. It had 18 towns and cities. In 1998, it had an area of 9982 km².

From 1990 to 1998, it was additionally divided into six district offices, each comprising several municipalities.

Demographics

Leaders 
The leader of the administrative division was the voivode. Those were:
 1975–1981: Jan Urbanowicz
 1981–1986: Zdzisław Mazurkiewicz
 1986–1990: Jacek Czayka
 1990–1993: Stanisław Socha
 1994–1997: Jerzy Mokrzycki
 1998: Grażyna Sztark

Citations

Notes

References 

History of Pomerania
Voivodeship, Koszalin, 1975-1998
Former voivodeships of Poland (1975–1998)
States and territories established in 1975
States and territories disestablished in 1998
1975 establishments in Poland
1998 disestablishments in Poland